Eschscholzia californica, the California poppy, golden poppy, California sunlight or cup of gold, is a species of flowering plant in the family Papaveraceae, native to the United States and Mexico. It is cultivated as an ornamental plant flowering in summer (spring in southern Australia), with showy cup-shaped flowers in brilliant shades of red, orange and yellow (occasionally pink and white). It is also used as food or a garnish. It became the official state flower of California in 1903.

Description

The leaves are alternately divided into round, lobed segments. Flowering occurs from February to September in the northern hemisphere (spring, summer, fall). The petals close at night (or in cold, windy weather) and open again the following morning, although they may remain closed in cloudy weather. It survives mild winters in its native range, dying completely in colder climates.

Habitat
Its native habitat includes California and extends to Oregon, Washington, Nevada, Arizona, New Mexico, Sonora and northwest Baja California.
The Antelope Valley California Poppy Reserve is located in northern Los Angeles County. At the peak of the blooming season, orange flowers seem to cover all 1,745 acres (706 ha) of the reserve. Other prominent locations of California poppy meadows include Bear Valley (Colusa County) and Point Buchon (San Luis Obispo County).

Taxonomy
Eschscholzia californica was the first named species of the genus Eschscholzia, named by the German botanist Adelbert von Chamisso after the Baltic German botanist Johann Friedrich von Eschscholtz, his friend and colleague on Otto von Kotzebue’s scientific expedition to California and the greater Pacific circa 1810 aboard the Russian ship Rurik.

California poppy is highly variable, with over 90 synonyms. Some botanists accept two subspecies — one with four varieties (e.g., Leger and Rice, 2003) — though others do not recognize them as distinct (e.g., Jepson 1993):
E. californica subsp. californica, native to California, Baja California, and Oregon, widely planted as an ornamental, and an invasive elsewhere (see below).
E. californica subsp. californica var. californica, which is found along the coast from the San Francisco Peninsula north. They are perennial and somewhat prostrate, with yellow flowers.
E. californica subsp. californica var. maritima (E. L. Greene) Jeps., which is found along the coast from Monterey south to San Miguel Island.  They are perennial, long-lived, glaucous, short in stature, and have extremely prostrate growth and yellow flowers.
E. californica subsp. californica var. crocea (Benth.) Jeps., which grows in non-arid inland regions.  They are perennial, taller, and have orange flowers.
E. California subsp. californica var.  peninsularis (E. L. Greene) Munz, which is an annual or facultative annual growing in arid inland environments.
E. californica subsp. mexicana (E. L. Greene) C. Clark, the Mexican Gold Poppy, which is found in the Sonoran Desert. Some authorities refer to it as E. Mexicana.

Pollen production
A UK study of meadow flowers that focused on commercial mixes, but which also tested various common plants such as ragwort and dandelion, ranked the California poppy highly in pollen production, although it did not produce a significant amount of nectar. On a per-flower basis it ranked second, with a rate of 8.3±1.1μl. The corn poppy, Papaver rhoeas, topped the list for per-flower pollen production with its rate of 13.3 ± 2.8μl. When measuring the entire capitulum the top two species were the ox-eye daisy, Leucanthemum vulgare, with 15.9 ± 2μl, and Cosmos bipinnatus, which had a rate nearly equivalent to that of the corn poppy. As poppies are not wind-pollinated, their pollen poses no allergy risk via inhalation.

Uses

California poppy leaves are used as food or garnish, while the seeds are used in cooking. It has been used as a traditional medicine by indigenous people in California. There are no clinical trials showing it can effectively treat psychiatric disorders in humans.

Chemical compounds 
E. californica contains californidine (N+(CH3)2), allocryptopine, eschscholtzine N-CH3 (californidine), and other similar (Papaveraceae) alkaloids.

Cultivation
E. californica is drought-tolerant, self-seeding, and easy to cultivate. It is best grown as an annual in full sun and sandy, well-drained soil or loam. Horticulturalists have produced numerous cultivars with a range of colors and blossom and stem forms. These typically do not breed true on reseeding. Seeds are often sold as mixtures. The following cultivars have gained the Royal Horticultural Society's Award of Garden Merit:- 
'Apricot Chiffon' (yellow flushed with pink and orange)
'Dali' (red)
'Rose Chiffon' (pink and white)

Invasive potential
Because of its beauty and ease of growing, the California poppy was introduced into several regions with similar Mediterranean climates. It is commercially sold and widely naturalized in Australia, and was introduced to South Africa, Chile, and Argentina. It is recognized as a potentially invasive species within the United States, although no indications of ill effects have been reported for this plant where it has been introduced outside of California. The golden poppy has been displaced in large areas of its original habitat, such as Southern California, by more invasive exotic species, such as mustard or annual grasses.

Chilean population
In Chile, it was introduced from multiple sources between the mid-19th century and the early 20th century. It appears to have been both intentionally imported as an ornamental garden plant and accidentally introduced along with alfalfa seed grown in California. Since Chile and California have similar climatic regions and have experienced much agricultural exchange, it is perhaps not surprising that it was introduced to Chile. Once there, its perennial forms spread primarily in human-disturbed environments (Leger and Rice, 2003).

The introduced Chilean populations of California poppy appear to be larger and more fecund in their introduced range than in their native range (Leger and Rice, 2003). Introduced populations have been noted to be larger and more reproductively successful than native ones (Elton, 1958), and there has been much speculation as to why. An increase in resource availability, decreased competition, and release from enemy pressure have all been proposed as explanations.

One hypothesis is that the plant's resources devoted in the native range to a defense strategy can, in the absence of enemies, be devoted to increased growth and reproduction (the EICA Hypothesis, Blossey & Nötzold, 1995).  However, this is not the case with introduced populations of E. californica in Chile: the Chilean populations were actually more resistant to Californian caterpillars than native populations (Leger and Forister, 2005).

State flower of California

During the 1890s Sarah Plummer Lemmon advocated for the adoption of the golden poppy as the state flower of California, eventually writing the bill passed by the California Legislature and signed by Governor George Pardee in 1903. As the official state flower of California, Eschscholzia californica is pictured on welcome signs along highways entering California and on official Scenic Route signs.

See also
 Californidine, a chemical compound found in Eschscholzia californica

Notes

References

Elton, C. S. The ecology of invasions by animals and plants.  Chapman & Hall, London.

Jepson Flora Project (1993): Eschscholzia californica
Jepson eFlora (2012) Treatment
The California poppy and its relatives
Folia: List of California Poppy Cultivars

External links

Calflora Database: Eschscholzia californica  (California poppy)
USDA Plants profile for Eschscholzia californica (California poppy)
Jepson eFlora treatment of Eschscholzia californica
Wondermondo.com: Best locations of California Poppy fields
Eschscholzia californica — UC Photos gallery

californica
Flora of California
Flora of the Northwestern United States
Flora of the Southwestern United States
Flora of the West Coast of the United States
Flora of Baja California
Flora of New Mexico
Flora of the California desert regions
Flora of the Cascade Range
Flora of the Klamath Mountains
Flora of the Sierra Nevada (United States)
Natural history of the California chaparral and woodlands
Natural history of the California Coast Ranges
Natural history of the Central Valley (California)
Natural history of the Channel Islands of California
Natural history of the Mojave Desert
Natural history of the Peninsular Ranges
Natural history of the San Francisco Bay Area
Natural history of the Santa Monica Mountains
Natural history of the Transverse Ranges
North American desert flora
Johann Friedrich von Eschscholtz
Taxa named by Adelbert von Chamisso
Garden plants of North America
Symbols of California
Plants described in 1820